Tongp'yŏngyang station (East P'yŏngyang station) is a railway station located in P'yŏngyang, North Korea, on the P'yŏngdŏk Line of the Korean State Railway.

History
The station was opened by the Korean State Railway after the end of the Korean War as part of the realignment of the Taedonggang–Mirim section of the P'yŏngdŏk Line.

References

Railway stations in North Korea